The  Sumner Heights and Hazelwood Valley Railroad was built as an experimental minimum gauge railway near Boston in  1875.

Route and its construction 
The Sumner Heights and Hazelwood Valley Railroad and Vicinity. It was situated in the town of Hyde Park,  from Boston, on the line of the Boston and Providence Railroad. It was projected and built by George E. Mansfield as an experiment, and completed August 1875. It claimed to have been the narrowest gauge railroad in the world with a gauge of only  between the rails.

The line started from the summit of a small hill just back of the Hazelwood station, on the Providence Railroad, and after winding round the hill by sharp curves, comes down through Mr. Mansfield's back yard, and shot by an apparently very dangerous curve obliquely across a street, closely shaving a street corner, where it ran over a small bridge, and then across another street to the side near the railroad, and thence for a short distance parallel with the latter.

The maximum grade was 612 feet to the mile (116 ‰). The average grade was 280 feet to the mile (53 ‰). The curve on the bridge had a radius of  radius, with grade of 317 feet to the mile (60 ‰).

On these 
were nailed narrow strips of thin hoop iron, to complete the whole affair.

Rolling stock and its operation 

It would seem, at first sight, that the whole affair was a mere boy’s plaything, and a dangerous one at that; but a test of its capacity undeceived the proprietor of such hasty judgment. It would appear, to begin with, that the wheels of the car, with their small flanges, would be sure to jump the track at every curve, but by a peculiarity in the way of connecting them with the car (an invention of Mr. Mansfield) they follow the track in every wind and curve as surely as if they were much larger in diameter and had a corresponding depth of flange. Four heavy men could ride in the car, which descended by gravitation, and was under complete brake control. Those who have ridden upon it were surprised at the absence of oscillation.

Aftermath 
George Mansfield subsequently promoted the two foot gauge. He persuaded the citizens of Billerica in eastern Massachusetts of the economies of a two-foot line, and became general manager of the Billerica and Bedford Railroad when it was chartered in 1876 and built beginning in May 1877. George Mansfield was obsessed with narrow gauge and reducing what he called "oscillation," a phenomenon which is colloquially called harmonic rock or rock and roll. He did this by placing rail joints parallel to one another. A few years later Mansfield lifted the rails of the Billerica and Bedford Railroad and moved them and the rolling stock to Maine, where it became the Sandy River Railroad and later merged into the Sandy River and Rangeley Lakes Railroad. Mansfield's influence caused the construction of nearly a dozen 2-foot gauge railroads in the state of Maine.

References 

Minimum gauge railways
Transportation in Boston